Christoffer Faarup (born 28 December 1992 in Aarhus) is a former Danish alpine skier. He competed at the 2014 Winter Olympics and 2018 Winter Olympics. In 2007, he moved to Øyer, Norway, to pursue winter sports. He is a member of Hobro Skilklub and Lillehammer Skiklub.

World Cup results

Results per discipline

Standings through 25 January 2019

World Championship results

Olympic results

References

External links
http://data.fis-ski.com/dynamic/athlete-biography.html?sector=AL&listid=&competitorid=139317

1992 births
Alpine skiers at the 2014 Winter Olympics
Alpine skiers at the 2018 Winter Olympics
Living people
Olympic alpine skiers of Denmark
Danish male alpine skiers
Sportspeople from Aarhus